Christian Carlsen (18 September 1885 – 10 March 1961) was a Danish wrestler. He competed in the men's Greco-Roman lightweight at the 1908 Summer Olympics.

References

External links
 

1885 births
1961 deaths
Danish male sport wrestlers
Olympic wrestlers of Denmark
Wrestlers at the 1908 Summer Olympics
Sportspeople from Copenhagen
20th-century Danish people